Tecomán  is a municipality in the Mexican state of Colima. 
The municipal seat lies at Tecomán. The municipality covers an area of 834.77 km².

As of 2005, the municipality had a total population of 98,150.

Government

Mayors and municipal presidents

See also
Madrid, Colima

References

Municipalities of Colima